Thomas Ulrich (born 11 July 1975, in Berlin) is a German former professional boxer who competed from 1997 to 2012. He challenged twice for a light-heavyweight world title: the WBC title in 2005, and the WBO/lineal titles in 2006. He also held the European light-heavyweight title three times from 2002 to 2008. As an amateur, he won a bronze medal at the 1996 Olympics in the light-heavyweight division.

Amateur career 
Ulrich was the German Light Heavyweight Champion 1994. Ulrich won the light heavyweight bronze medal at the 1996 Summer Olympics, just like he did a year before at the 1995 World Amateur Boxing Championships in Berlin.

Amateur Highlights
1992 2nd place as a Middleweight at the Junior World Championships in Montreal, Canada. Results were:
Defeated Jae-Yeul Uk (South Korea) RSC-3
Defeated Willard Lewis (Canada) RSCI-2
Lost to Islam Arsangaliev (Russia) RSC-1
1995 3rd place as a Light Heavyweight at the World Championships in Berlin, Germany. Results were:
Defeated Yevgeny Makarenko (Russia) PTS
Defeated Mohammed Benguesmia (Algeria) PTS
Defeated Timur Ibragimov (Uzbekistan) WO
Lost to Diosvani Vega (Cuba) PTS
1995 2nd place at the Military World Championships in Rome, Italy. Results were:
Defeated Um (South Korea) RSC-1
Defeated Sergey Krupenich (Belarus) PTS (10-6)
Lost to Pietro Aurino (Italy) PTS (6-10)
1996 competed at the European Championships in Vejle, Denmark. Results were:
Defeated Zoltán Béres (Hungary) RSC-1
Lost to Yusuf Öztürk (Turkey) PTS (10-15)
1996 Representing Germany, Ulrich won the Bronze Medal as a Light Heavyweight at the Atlanta Olympics. Results were:
Defeated Rick Timperi (Australia) PTS (21-7)
Defeated Ismael Kone (Sweden) PTS (24-9)
Defeated Daniel Bispo (Brazil) PTS (14-7)
Lost to Lee Seung-Bae (South Korea) PTS (8-12)

Pro career
Ulrich turned pro 1997 and began his career 20-0 before getting stopped in the 6th round by future titlist Glen Johnson. He then won his next eight bouts, setting up a shot at WBC Light Heavyweight Title holder Tomasz Adamek in 2005. Adamek won via 6th-round KO. In 2006, Ulrich got a shot at WBO Light Heavyweight Title holder Zsolt Erdei and lost a decision.

Professional boxing record

External links
 News and Pictures of Thomas Ulrich
 

1975 births
Living people
Boxers at the 1996 Summer Olympics
Olympic boxers of Germany
Boxers from Berlin
Olympic bronze medalists for Germany
Olympic medalists in boxing
German male boxers
AIBA World Boxing Championships medalists
Medalists at the 1996 Summer Olympics
Light-heavyweight boxers